Eliza Walker may refer to:

Eliza Walker Dunbar (physician) (1845–1925), Scottish physician
Eliza Rennie or Mrs. Eliza Walker (1813–1869), Scottish author
Eliza Bannister Walker of Blandome, 20th-century American social worker in Virginia
Eliza Walker, a ship which collided with the clipper ship Red Jacket in 1878 and sank
Eliza Walker Crump (1857-1928), African-American singer

See also
Elizabeth Walker (disambiguation)

Walker, Eliza